North-South Axis can refer to

 North–South Axis (Brussels), a tram tunnel in Brussels, Belgium
 Prachtallee ("Avenue of Splendour"), a major north–south avenue in Berlin planned by Albert Speer as the linchpin of the Welthauptstadt Germania, never built due to Nazi Germany's downfall